From My Farming Days (Low German: Ut mine Stromtid) is a novel by Fritz Reuter, originally published in three volumes between 1862 and 1864. Written in Low German, it portrays life in rural Mecklenburg in the 1840s in the context of the Revolutions of 1848. The novel was autobiographically-inspired as Reuter had himself worked as an apprentice farmer during the era. In 1878 it was translated into English by  M.W. MacDowell.

Although not the main character, the genial land inspector "Onkel" Zacharias Bräsig became the most well-known and his role was often emphasised in adaptations of the story.

Adaptations
The story was one of Reuter's most successful works and has been adapted into other media a number of times including: 
 During My Apprenticeship, a 1919 German silent film
 Life in the Country, a 1924 Swedish silent film
 Struggle for the Soil, a 1925 German silent film
 Uncle Bräsig, a 1936 German film
 Life in the Country, a 1943 Swedish film
 A Farmer's Life, a 1965 Danish film
 Uncle Bräsig, a West German television series between 1978 and 1980

References

Bibliography
 Goble, Alan. The Complete Index to Literary Sources in Film. Walter de Gruyter, 1999.
 Mews, Siegfried & Hardin, James N. Nineteenth-century German Writers, 1841-1900. Gale Research, 1993.

1862 novels
Novels by Fritz Reuter
German novels adapted into films
German novels adapted into television shows
Novels set in the 1840s